The Jasper Downtown Historic District comprises  of Jasper, Alabama, centered on the county courthouse. Most of the buildings in the district are commercial, with other uses including the Masonic Temple, the post office and city hall, several houses and a number of warehouses. Most of the buildings were built in the 1920s through the 1940s. A variety of architectural styles are preserved, including Beaux-Arts and Art Deco.

The district was added to the National Register of Historic Places on March 31, 2004.

References

External links

 
 
 
 
 

Historic districts on the National Register of Historic Places in Alabama
Queen Anne architecture in Alabama
Neoclassical architecture in Alabama
Historic districts in Walker County, Alabama
Historic American Buildings Survey in Alabama
National Register of Historic Places in Walker County, Alabama